The  is a canal in Wallonia, Belgium, which, with other canals, links the waterways of the  and  rivers. It connects the artificial lake  near , with the Brussels–Charleroi Canal near .

Route 
The canal climbs by means of six locks.

Therefore, this section contains four hydraulic boat lifts, dating from 1888 to 1917, which are now on the UNESCO World Heritage list (see Boat Lifts on the ). These lifts were designed by Edwin Clark of the British company Clark, Stansfield & Clark. For commercial traffic this stretch of the canal has, since 2002, been replaced by an enlarged parallel canal.

History

Old canal 

In 1879, the Ministry of Public Works adopted a proposal by Edwin Clark which used boat lifts instead of locks. The first lift was built between 1885 and 1888. It was inaugurated on June 4, 1888 by King Leopold II.
The three other boat lifts were finally finished in 1917 and put into service in 1919.  There were several reasons for this delay.  From 1894 to 1911, the economic need for the canal was repeatedly called into question.  Then in 1914, when the three lifts were practically finished, World War I began.

New canal 
The old canal could accommodate boats with a displacement of up to 350 tons. In the event, it was decided to alter the course of the canal rather than to enlarge it along the full extent of its existing length. A defining feature of the enlarged canal was the Strépy-Thieu boat lift which replaced the four smaller boat lifts and one or two locks which had been part of the former canal.   

The  was opened to boats with a displacement of 1,350 tonnes in September 2002.   Between 2000 and 2004 the annual ship transits increased from 1,531 to 4,041 while the tonnage carried increased from 282,000 to 1,513,000.

The lifts on the old parallel canal remain in position, having in 1998 been designated a UNESCO World Heritage Site.

References

External links 
  Official website
Maps and photographs of canal lifts

Canals in Wallonia
Canals in Hainaut (province)
Canals opened in 1919